"That's Entrainment" is a song written by Northern Irish singer-songwriter Van Morrison and included  on his 2008 album, Keep It Simple.

Morrison  described the meaning of the word "entrainment" and the music on the album thus:
Entrainment is when you connect with the music...Entrainment is really what I'm getting at in the music...It's kind of when you're in the present moment - you're here - with no past or future.

"That's Entrainment"  was played for the first time, at the beginning of the second hour, on Chris Evans BBC 2  Drivetime show  on Wednesday, January 30, 2008, with Evans commenting  "The new Van Morrison album came with a shoot to kill warning if played before a certain date, but that's now been lifted so we can play it."

Personnel  on original release
Van Morrison - vocals,  ukulele
Mick Green - guitar
Paul Moore - bass
Neil Wilkinson - drums

Notes

2008 songs
Van Morrison songs
Songs written by Van Morrison
Song recordings produced by Van Morrison